Stephen John Randall (born 9 June 1980) is a former English cricketer.  Randall is a right-handed batsman who bowls right-arm off break.  He was born in Nottingham, Nottinghamshire.

Randall made his debut in List-A cricket for the Nottinghamshire Cricket Board against Scotland in the 1999 NatWest Trophy.

Randall made his first-class debut for Nottinghamshire against Middlesex in the 1999 County Championship.  From 1999 to 2002, he represented the county in 10 first-class matches, the last of which came against Glamorgan.  In his 10 first-class matches, he scored 116 runs at a batting average of 8.92, with a high score of 28.  With the ball he took 8 wickets at a bowling average of 118.87, with best figures of 2/64.

His List-A debut for Nottinghamshire came against Gloucestershire in 2001.  From 2001 to 2003, he represented the county in 20 List-A matches, the last of which came against Middlesex.  In his 20 List-A matches for the county he scored 121 runs, at an average of 17.28, with a high score of 25.  With the ball he took 15 wickets at an average of 49.20, with best figures of 3/44.

In local domestic cricket, he currently plays for Caythorpe Cricket Club in the Nottinghamshire Cricket Board Premier League.

References

External links
Stephen Randall at Cricinfo
Stephen Randall at CricketArchive

1980 births
Living people
Cricketers from Nottingham
English cricketers
Nottinghamshire Cricket Board cricketers
Nottinghamshire cricketers